Massimiliano Maddaloni (born 22 June 1966) is an Italian manager and former footballer who played predominantly as a midfielder, most recently in charge as the head coach of Serie C club Siena.

Playing career
A midfielder, Maddaloni's playing career was short-lived and mostly spent in the Serie C league.

Coaching career
Maddaloni started his coaching career in the early 2000s with Viareggio. He successively coached a number of Tuscan teams before accepting a job as a youth coach at Juventus in 2008.

He was successively appointed head coach of Serie C club Carpi for the 2011–12 season but resigned shortly thereafter on 10 October 2011. He successively moved to China working as an assistant to a number of Italian managers, including Marcello Lippi, Roberto Donadoni and Fabio Cannavaro, until 2020.

On 19 March 2019 he received the "Tommaso Maestrelli" career award.

On 25 October 2021, Maddaloni returned to Italy as the new head coach of Serie C club Siena, replacing Alberto Gilardino, with Michelangelo Rampulla as his assistant. They were both sacked just less than two months later, on 15 December, due to negative results.

Career statistics

Club

Notes

References

External links

Massimiliano Maddaloni on Soccerway

1966 births
Living people
Footballers from Rome
Italian footballers
Association football midfielders
Serie A players
Serie C players
S.S.C. Napoli players
Italian football managers
Serie C managers
A.C.N. Siena 1904 managers
Expatriate football managers in China
Italian expatriate football managers
Italian expatriate sportspeople in China